Chhinch is a village in Banswara District, Rajasthan, India. The village is home to a temple to Lord Brahma, dating from the 12th Century. The main occupation of the people is agriculture including the production of wheat, maize, and soybeans.

Brahmaji Mandir Chhinch

Place to see

Brahmaji Temple, Chhinch (12th century Temple)
Shirsha Mata (Amba mata)Temple
Mankameshvar mahadev Temple
Guru Aashram
Vahrai mata Temple
Laxminarayan Temple
Govardhan Nath Temple
Ramji Temple
Radhakrashan Temple
Mahalaxmi Temple
Ganesh ji Temple
Aamaliya Lake
Bramah Sarovar
Jwalamukhi mata Temple
Rin mukteshvar Mahadev Temple
Ananpurana Mata Temple
Bhuneshvar Mahadev
Ranchodray Temple
Hasthinapur Dham (Lok devta)

Demographics

Chhinch is a large village located in Bagidora of Banswara district, Rajasthan containing 1138 families. The population as of the 2011 census was 5,662 (2936 males, 2726 females).

In Chhinch village population of children with age 0-6 is 771 which makes up 13.62% of total population of village. Average Sex Ratio of Chhinch village is 928 which is equal than Rajasthan state average of 928. Child Sex Ratio for the Chheench as per census is 853, lower than Rajasthan average of 888.

Chhinch village has higher literacy rate compared to Rajasthan. In 2011, literacy rate of Chhinch village was 76.18% compared to 66.11% of Rajasthan. In Chheench Male literacy stands at 89.64% while female literacy rate was 61.87%.

References

http://www.census2011.co.in/data/village/99376-chheench-rajasthan.html

Cities and towns in Banswara district